= Stanton P. Sender =

American lawyer

Stanton P. Sender (November 11, 1932, in Seattle, Washington – November 7, 1995), was an honour graduate of Harvard College and received a J.D. from Harvard Law School in 1956. Upon completing his education, Sender returned to Washington State, where he served as Assistant Attorney General from 1956 to 1961.

In 1961, Sender took on the role of trial attorney for the United States Interstate Commerce Commission (ICC) in Washington, D.C. It was here that Sender became deeply involved with transportation issues, a field that would define his career. The United States methods of transporting goods and materials were evolving, from dominance by railroads to a diversified system incorporating air transport and trucking. Sender became a convert to the idea of deregulating transportation and worked to advance that goal.

From 1963 to 1969, Sender served as transportation counsel for the United States Senate Commerce Committee. In 1969, he transitioned to the private sector, joining Sears, Roebuck and Company as Assistant General Counsel for Transportation and Telecommunications. This position was specifically created to enable Sears to lobby Congress on transportation issues. Sender played a crucial role at Sears, navigating the company through complex transportation legislation and legal challenges over the course of 20 years, during which time important transportation legislation and legal precedents emerged.

Upon leaving Sears in 1989, Sender joined the Washington, D.C., law firm of Morgan, Lewis, and Bockius, where he continued to specialize in transportation law and lobbying. He was treasurer of the National Industrial Transportation League and belonged to many transportation-related organizations. He was chosen Man of the Year by Chilton's Distribution in 1986. Stanton P. Sender died several days after suffering a massive heart attack. He was survived by his wife, Michelle Sender, and two sons, Jason and Todd.
